Dhahar District is an administrative district in the Sanaag region.

In the  administrative divisions of Somaliland, it is a C-class district according to the 2019 Local Government Law.

In the administrative division of Puntland, the district is the capital of the Haylan region.

Recent History
In April 2012, Somaliland forces in Dhahar district paid their soldiers' salaries in Somaliland shillings for the first time, having previously been paid in Somali shillings.

In July 2015, a knowledge contest was held in Dhahar City with representatives from six areas of Dhahar District, with Horseed area taking first place, Hodman area taking second place, and New Dhahar area taking third place.

In May 2018, the Puntland forces left Af Urur village in Dhahar district, and in June 2019, al-Shabaab militants took over the village.

In February 2020, construction began on the first 1.5 km paved road in the Dhahar district.

In March 2021, Puntland forces used live ammunition against demonstrators supporting the Federal Government of Somalia in Dhahar district. The Federal Government condemned Puntland's actions.

In June 2022, at a meeting in Erigavo city, which is effectively controlled by Somaliland, it was resolved that the Warsangali community is fully part of the Somaliland community and that the Somaliland government will elevate the Dhahar district to a region.

See also
Administrative divisions of Somaliland
Regions of Somaliland
Districts of Somaliland
Somalia–Somaliland border

References

Districts of Somaliland
Sanaag